Paraburkholderia acidipaludis is a Gram-negative, catalase- and oxidase-positive, aerobic, aluminium-tolerant, non-spore-forming, nonmotile bacterium of the genus Paraburkholderia and the family Burkholderiaceae, which was isolated from the Chinese water chestnut (Eleocharis dulcis) in Vietnam and Thailand. Colonies of Paraburkholderia acidipaludis are pale yellow.

References

acidipaludis
Bacteria described in 2010